Cors Goch National Nature Reserve may refer to:

 Cors Goch National Nature Reserve (Anglesey)
 Cors Goch National Nature Reserve (Llanllwch)